This article contains information about the literary events and publications of 1757.

Events
February 16 – Jonathan Edwards becomes President of the institution that will become Princeton University.
May 3 – The Irish-born actress Peg Woffington, playing Rosalind in As You Like It, suffers a stroke on stage at the Theatre Royal, Covent Garden in London and never acts again.
May 6 – Asylum confinement of Christopher Smart:  The poet Christopher Smart is confined to St Luke's Hospital for Lunatics in London.
May – The Baskerville typeface, designed by John Baskerville of Birmingham, England, is first used in a wove paper quarto edition of Virgil (Publii Virgilii Maronis Bucolica, Georgica, et Æneis).
September – Pierre-Augustin Caron begins using the name Beaumarchais.
September 9 – The Parlement of Toulouse orders a public burning of Jesuit author Hermann Busenbaum's Medulla Theologiae Morales because of its treatment of the subject of regicide.
December 11 – On the death of Colley Cibber as Poet Laureate of Great Britain, the post is declined by Thomas Gray and passes to William Whitehead.
unknown dates
Angelo Maria Bandini is appointed librarian of the Laurentian Library in Florence.
Robert Raikes becomes proprietor of the Gloucester Journal.
Horace Walpole begins the Strawberry Hill Press.
Thomas Warton is appointed Professor of Poetry at the University of Oxford.

New books

Prose
John Brown – An Estimate of the Manners and Principles of the Times
Edmund Burke – A Philosophical Enquiry into the Origin of Our Ideas of the Sublime and Beautiful
John Dalrymple – An Essay Towards a General History of Feudal Property in Great Britain
Samuel Derrick (probable compiler) – Harris's List of Covent Garden Ladies (1st edn)
Adam Ferguson – The Morality of Stage-Plays Seriously Considered
Sarah Fielding – The Lives of Cleopatra and Octavia
Edward and Elizabeth Griffith – A Series of Genuine Letters between Henry and Frances vols. i – ii.
David Hume – The Natural History of Religion
Soame Jenyns – A Free Inquiry into the Nature and Origin of Evil
Richard Price – Review of the Principal Questions in Morals
Madame Riccoboni – Lettres de Mistriss Fanny Butlerd.
Tobias Smollett – A Complete History of England
Horace Walpole – A Letter from Xo Ho, a Chinese Philosopher at London, to his Friend Lien Chi at Peking
William Warburton – Remarks upon Mr. David Hume's Essay on the Natural History of Religion
Joseph Warton – Essay on Pope
John Wesley – The Doctrine of Original Sin

Drama
Anonymous – The Taxes
Phanuel Bacon – Humorous Ethics, or an Attempt to Cure the Vices and Follies of the Age by a Method Entirely New (5 plays)
Denis Diderot – Le Fils naturel
Samuel Foote – The Author
David Garrick – Lilliput
John Home – Douglas
Tobias Smollett – The Reprisal

Poetry

Robert Andrews – Eidyllia
Cornelius Arnold – Poems
Samuel Boyce – Poems
John Gilbert Cooper as "Aristippus" – Epistles to the Great
John Duncombe – The Feminead (answer to 1754's Feminiad)
William Duncombe – The Works of Horace in English Verse (various translators).
John Dyer – The Fleece
Carlo Gozzi – La tartana degli influssi per l'anno 1756
Thomas Gray – Odes
William Thompson – Poems
William Wilkie – Epigoniad
Edward Young – The Works of the Author of Night Thoughts

Births
February 1 – John Philip Kemble, English actor (died 1823)
February 6 – Julian Ursyn Niemcewicz, Polish poet and dramatist (died 1841)
April 9 – Wojciech Bogusławski, Polish actor, director and dramatist (died 1829)
July 21 – Basilius von Ramdohr, German journalist and critic (died 1822)
November 9 – William Sotheby, English poet and translator (died 1833)
November 13 – Archibald Alison, Scottish essayist and cleric (died 1839)
November 18 – William Blake, English poet and artist (died 1827)
November 27 (possible year) – Mary Robinson (née Darby), English poet, actress and royal mistress (died 1800)
December 4 – Charles Burney, English classicist and book thief (died 1817)
Unknown date – Giovanni Antonio Galignani, Italian publisher (died 1821)

Deaths
January 9 – Bernard Le Bovier de Fontenelle, French dramatist and author (born 1657)
January 19 – Thomas Ruddiman, Scottish classical scholar, editor, printer and librarian (born 1674)
March 1 – Edward Moore, English dramatist (born 1712)
March 8 – Thomas Blackwell, Scottish classical scholar (born 1701)
August 28 – David Hartley, English philosopher and psychologist (born 1705)
December 11
Colley Cibber, English dramatist, actor-manager and Poet Laureate of Great Britain (born 1671)
Edmund Curll, English bookseller and publisher (born 1675)
December 15 (burial) – John Dyer, a Welsh poet, painter and Anglican cleric (born 1699)

In literature
John Dickson Carr – The Demoniacs (1962)
James Fenimore Cooper – The Last of the Mohicans: A Narrative of 1757 (1826)

References

 
Years of the 18th century in literature